Aleksei Serebryakov may refer to:
 Aleksei Serebryakov (actor) (born 1964), Russian actor
 Aleksei Serebryakov (footballer) (born 1976), Russian footballer